The PROTECT Act of 2003 (117 Stat. 650, S. 151, enacted April 30, 2003) is a United States law with the stated intent of preventing child abuse as well as investigating and prosecuting violent crimes against children. "PROTECT" is a contrived acronym which stands for "Prosecutorial Remedies and Other Tools to end the Exploitation of Children Today".

The PROTECT Act incorporates the Truth in Domain Names Act (TDNA) of 2003 (originally two separate Bills, submitted by Senator Orrin Hatch and Congressman Mike Pence), codified at 18 U.S.C. § 2252(B)(b).

Overview 
The law has the following effects:

Provides for mandatory life imprisonment of sex offenders convicted of sex offenses against a minor if the offender has had a prior conviction of abuse against a minor, with some exceptions.
Establishes a program to obtain criminal history background checks for volunteer organizations.
Authorizes wiretapping and monitoring of other communications in all cases related to child abuse or kidnapping.
Eliminates statutes of limitations for child abduction or child abuse.
Bars pretrial release of persons charged with specified offenses against or involving children.
Assigns a national AMBER Alert Coordinator.
Implemented Suzanne's Law. Named after Suzanne Lyall, a 19-year-old college student at the University at Albany who disappeared in 1998, the law eliminates waiting periods before law enforcement agencies will investigate reports of missing adults ages 18–21. These reports are also filed with the NCIC.
Prohibits computer-generated child pornography when "(B) such visual depiction is a computer image or computer-generated image that is, or appears virtually indistinguishable from that of a minor engaging in sexually explicit conduct"; (as amended by 1466A for Section 2256(8)(B) of title 18, United States Code).
Prohibits drawings, sculptures, and pictures of such drawings and sculptures depicting minors in actions or situations that meet the Miller test of being obscene, OR depicting minors who are engaged in sex acts that are deemed obscene under an alternate test that removes the "community standards" prong of the Miller test.  The law does not explicitly state that images of fictional beings who appear to be under 18 engaged in sexual acts that are not deemed to be obscene are rendered illegal in and of their own condition (illustration of sex of fictional minors).
Minimum sentence of 5 years for possession, 10 years for distribution.
Authorizes fines and/or imprisonment for up to 30 years for U.S. citizens or residents who engage in illicit sexual conduct abroad. For the purposes of this law, illicit sexual conduct is defined as commercial sex with or sexual abuse of anyone under 18, or any sex with anyone under 16. Previous US law was less strict, only punishing those having sex either in contravention of local laws OR in commerce (prostitution); but did not prohibit non-commercial sex with, for example, a 14-year-old if such sex was legal in the foreign territory.
Incorporated other proposed legislation existing at the time as:
the Code Adam Act of 2003, (Title III, Subtitle D)
the Truth in Domain Names proposed language (Title V, Subtitle B)
the Secure Authentication Feature and Enhanced Identification Defense Act of 2003, also cited as the SAFE ID Act, (Title VI, Section 607.)
the Illicit Drug Anti-Proliferation Act of 2003 (Title VI, Section 608.)

The PROTECT Act mandated that the United States Attorney General promulgate new regulations to enforce the 2257 recordkeeping regulation, colloquially known as the '2257 Regulations'. The Free Speech Coalition has filed a lawsuit against the United States Department of Justice claiming the 2257 Regulations are unconstitutional.

The PROTECT Act includes prohibitions against obscene illustrations depicting child pornography, including computer-generated illustrations, also known as virtual child pornography. Previous provisions outlawing virtual child pornography in the Child Pornography Prevention Act of 1996 had been ruled unconstitutional by the U.S. Supreme Court in its 2002 decision, Ashcroft v. Free Speech Coalition. The PROTECT ACT attached an obscenity requirement under the Miller test or the variant test noted above to overcome this limitation.

The PROTECT Act allows sex offenders to be sentenced to a lifetime term of federal supervised release. Although targeted most directly at sex offenders, it the PROTECT Act affects all federal supervised releasees.

The act was signed into law by President George W. Bush on April 30, 2003.

Application of the Act

Appellate Court

On April 6, 2006, in United States v. Williams, the Eleventh Circuit Court of Appeals ruled that one component of the PROTECT Act, the "pandering provision" codified at (a)(3)(B) of the United States Code, violated the First Amendment.  The "pandering provision" conferred criminal liability on anyone who knowingly

advertises, promotes, presents, distributes, or solicits through the mails, or in interstate or foreign commerce by any means, including by computer, any material or purported material in a manner that reflects the belief, or that is intended to cause another to believe, that the material or purported material is, or contains (i) an obscene visual depiction of a minor engaging in sexually explicit conduct; or (ii) a visual depiction of an actual minor engaging in sexually explicit conduct.

The Williams court held that although the content described in subsections (i) and (ii) is not constitutionally protected, speech that advertises or promotes such content does have the protection of the First Amendment. Based on this determination, the court held § 2252A(a)(3)(B) to be unconstitutionally overbroad.  The Eleventh Circuit further stated that the law was unconstitutionally vague, in that it did not adequately and specifically describe what sort of speech was criminally actionable.

Supreme Court Cases 
The Department of Justice appealed the Eleventh Circuit's ruling to the U.S. Supreme Court. The Supreme Court reversed the Eleventh Circuit's ruling in May 2008 and upheld this portion of the act.

Convictions
The first conviction of a person found to have violated the sections of the act relating to virtual child pornography was Dwight Whorley of Virginia, who used computers at the Virginia Employment Commission to download "Japanese anime style cartoons of children engaged in explicit sexual conduct with adults" alleged to depict "children engaged in explicit sexual conduct with adults". He was charged with 19 counts of "knowingly receiving" child pornography for printing out two cartoons and viewing others. His conviction was upheld in a 2–1 panel decision of the Fourth Circuit Court of Appeals in December 2008. This decision was consistent with the U.S. Supreme Court ruling in Ashcroft v. Free Speech Coalition in which the Supreme Court held that virtual child pornography was protected free speech, provided that the virtual depictions are not obscene. Obscenity, including obscene depictions of children, either virtual or real, is unprotected speech. (Whorley was also previously convicted of offenses in connection with pornographic depictions of real children.)

Also in 2008, Christopher Handley, a "prolific collector" of manga, pleaded guilty to charges related to the PROTECT Act, in exchange for a six-month plea deal, five years of probation, and forfeiture of his collection of manga and anime that had been seized by police. He was facing a maximum sentence of up to twenty years. While not convicted by a jury, he was the first person charged under the PROTECT Act for the lone act of possessing art deemed obscene, in the form of seven manga graphic novels ordered from Japan. In the case United States v. Handley, district court Judge James E. Gritzner ruled that two parts of the PROTECT Act that criminalized certain depictions without having to go through the Miller test were overbroad and thus unconstitutional. Handley still faces an obscenity charge. Both prosecutors and defense attorneys noted that the plea deal was due to the high risk of a constitutional challenge, and the federal government agreed that Handley would not be required to register as a sex offender. A later ruling in United States v. Dean challenged the Handley overbreadth ruling because the Handley ruling did not prove that the sections had "substantial overbreadth".

Criticism

According to Adler, Delohery, and Charles Brownstein, "the current law raises concerns for creators, publishers, and collectors of various forms of entertainment (including, but not limited to, comics/manga, video games, and fine art)."  Bell argues that the PROTECT Act should be reexamined by Congress because it infringes on the First Amendment's right to free expression.

See also
Laws regarding child pornography
Legal status of drawn pornography depicting minors

References

https://www.rcfp.org/journals/the-news-media-and-the-law-winter-2000/acts-prohibition-simulated/

Further reading 
 
  (Archive)
 Fraley, Amy. "Child Sex Tourism Legislation Under the PROTECT Act: Does It Really Protect?" (Archive). St. John's Law Review. Spring 2005, Issue 2, Volume 79, Number 2, Article 7. Posted in February 2012. p. 445-484.

External links
 Text of the Act at GovTrack
 Text of the Act  at THOMAS
 Text of 11th Circuit decision in United States v. Williams
 Legislative history at GovTrack

Child pornography law
Sex laws
United States federal criminal legislation
Acts of the 108th United States Congress